Wings of Youth may refer to:

 Wings of Youth (1925 film), an American drama film
 Wings of Youth (1940 film), a Canadian short documentary film
 Wings of Youth (1949 film), a Spanish drama film